Jan de Bisschop, also known as Johannes Episcopius (1628–1671), was a lawyer, who became a Dutch Golden Age painter and engraver.

Biography

According to the RKD he learned to draw from Bartholomeus Breenbergh, and he influenced in his turn Jacob van der Ulft. Both Ulft and Bisschop were born into good families and were examples of painters who practised art more for pleasure than for a living. Bisschop was a founding member of the Confrerie Pictura and produced two books in the 1670s meant as instructional material for young artists. These were based on his own copies from classical artists, but also copies from the Rome-traveller, Pieter Donker. One was 112 prints that was produced in the years 1668-1669 as the Signorum Veterum Icones (Dutch title: Afbeeldingen van antieke beelden), and the other was printed in 1671 as Paradigmata Graphices variorum Artificum (Dutch title: Voor-beelden der Teken-Konst van verscheyde Meesters).

According to Houbraken he was a lawyer for the Dutch court, and did a great service to the arts with his instructional drawings copied from the artists Tintoretto, Jacopo Bassano, Annibale Carracci (Karats), Paolo Veronese, Rubens, and Anthony van Dyck.

References

 Jan de Bisschop and his Icones & Paradigmata, classical antiquities and Italian drawings for artistic instruction in seventeenth century Holland, by J. G. van Gelder, 1985, Davaco
 Jan de Bisschop in the RKD

External links
Vermeer and The Delft School, a full text exhibition catalog from The Metropolitan Museum of Art, which contains material on Jan de Bisschop

1628 births
1671 deaths
Dutch Golden Age painters
Dutch male painters
Painters from Amsterdam
Painters from The Hague